Rahul Ravindran (born 23 June 1981) is an Indian actor, director, and screenwriter who works in Telugu and Tamil films. He made his lead debut in the Tamil film Moscowin Kavery (2010), before playing leading roles as a man with cerebral palsy in Vinmeengal and as a mechanic in Soorya Nagaram. He made his Telugu film debut with Andala Rakshasi (2012) and went on to make a career as a leading actor in the Telugu film industry.

He made his debut as a director with a Telugu film Chi La Sow (2018) for which he won the National Award for Best Original Screenplay

Early life and family
Rahul Ravindran was born on 23 June 1981 in Chennai. His roots are from the Thanjavur district of Tamil Nadu. After graduating from Vidya Mandir Senior Secondary School, he earned his bachelor's degree in Commerce. He then went on to get a Masters in Business Management, and then was an Assistant Brand Manager for a leading media company in Mumbai.

Career
It was in Mumbai, while dining at a restaurant, that he got an offer to audition for a television commercial to be directed by Dibakar Banerjee of Khosla Ka Ghosla fame, and the success of that fetched him  more commercials. During this period he was also dubbing in Tamil for cartoons and children's shows being aired on television channels, notably being the Tamil voice of the Red Ranger in Power Rangers - Mystic Force and the White Ranger in Power Rangers SPD. He played a minor role in Arjun's Madrasi (2006).

He then quit his job and came back to Chennai to try to find work as an assistant director, but before he could do so director Ravi Varman's team members saw his ad work and called him to audition for Moscowin Kavery. The film introduced a host of new actors including Samantha, with music carried out by Thaman, then making his debut in music composing. However, due to Ravi Varman's date conflicts with his projects as a cinematographer, the film languished in development hell, eventually releasing in August 2010. The film gained unanimously poor reviews from critics, with Rahul winning mixed reviews for his performance. While a critic from Behindwoods.com noted that "he looks every bit the suave software professional", other critics saying that his performance was "wooden" and that he "smiles too much and looks like he could do well, given the chance".

He was next seen in Vignesh Menon's Vinmeengal, where he played Jeeva, who is affected by cerebral palsy. The film which also featured Anuja Iyer, Bhavana Rao and Pandiarajan won above average reviews, with Rahul's performance being appreciated. The Indian Express cited that "Rahul brings out splendidly not just the physicality of his character, but also the emotional trauma", while Behindwoods.com noted that "the handsome Rahul Ravindran utilizes his opportunity and delivers the goods well." However, the critic from The Hindu noted "at times Rahul's trauma doesn't come out effectively, so you feel he could have done better". His third film, Chellamuthu's Soorya Nagaram opposite Meera Nandan faced a much smaller release and won average reviews from critics. Playing Vetrivel, a shop mechanic in Madurai, the film focussed on inter-caste marriage and parental opposition, with a critic citing that Rahul is "good and emotes well". Later in 2012, he featured in the Telugu film Andala Rakshasi, earning positive reviews for his performance and earning him further opportunities in the Telugu film industry.

In 2013, Rahul played a supporting role in the romantic comedy Vanakkam Chennai, featuring alongside Shiva and Priya Anand, with the film performing well at the box office. His Telugu releases in the year, Pelli Pustakam and Nenem…Chinna Pillana?, had significantly smaller budgets and did not fare as well. His 2014 release, Ala Ela became a sleeper hit at the box office, with the film earning audiences through positive word-of-mouth via social media. In 2015, he acted as childhood friends in the action entertainer Tiger with Sundeep Kishan followed the family entertainer, Srimanthudu which also stars with Mahesh Babu. In 2018, he then starred in the romance films Hyderabad Love Story and Howrah Bridge. He also won the National Film Award for Best Original Screenplay  for his debut film Chi La Sow. Rahul Ravindran was seen in the Tamil and Telugu remakes of the Kannada film U Turn  starring Samantha and Aadhi Pinisetty.

In 2019, he directed Manmadhudu 2 was a failure. In 2021, he also starred with Nani and Sai Pallavi in Shyam Singha Roy.

In 2023, he essay the role of the husband in the Tamil drama The Great Indian Kitchen, a remake of the Malayalam version was released to highly positive reviews from critics and audiences.

Personal life
His Parents are Ravindran and Vasumathi He has a younger brother Rohit, who is a professional photographer.

Rahul Ravindran is married to singer Chinmayi in May 2014, whom he began dating in June 2013 after meeting her at the premiere of Andala Rakshasi. Chinmayi  dubbed for the heroine in the movie.The pair were blessed with twins- a boy and a girl named Sharvas and Driptah on 22 June 2022

Filmography

Actor

Director

Dubbing artist
J iiva - 83 (Telugu dubbed version)

References 

Indian male film actors
21st-century Indian male actors
Living people
1981 births
Male actors from Chennai
Male actors in Tamil cinema
Male actors in Telugu cinema
Best Original Screenplay National Film Award winners
Telugu film directors
Telugu screenwriters